Blanche Shoemaker Wagstaff ( Shoemaker, later Carr) (July 10, 1888 – December 15, 1967) was an American poet.

Early life
Blanche was born in Larchmont, New York on July 10, 1888 but spent much of her life in New York City. She was the only daughter of Henry Francis Shoemaker (1843–1918), a railroad magnate and close confidante of future Vice President Charles W. Fairbanks, and Blanche ( Quiggle) Shoemaker (1853–1928).  Among her siblings were Henry Wharton Shoemaker and William Brock Shoemaker, who married Ella Morris De Peyster (a daughter of Frederic James De Peyster) in 1905, but died tragically in an elevator accident a few months after his wedding in 1906. Her mother was the sole daughter of railroad magnate and diplomat Col. James W. Quiggle of Philadelphia and Lock Haven, Pennsylvania.

She began writing at age 7, and had sold her first poem, to Town & Country, by age 16. In 1905, her portrait was painted by the French artist Théobald Chartran. After she made her debut in New York City, she was presented at the Court of St. James and later had a private interview with Pope Pius.

Career
Blanche served for a time as the associate editor of The International, a magazine founded by her close friend George Sylvester Viereck, whose sensual, decadent verse mirrored Wagstaff's. She praised his work, although the two had a falling out over Viereck's support of Germany in the first World War, later reconciling in 1924. Her verse often dealt with sensual and classical themes, and twelve of her poems were anthologized in T. R. Smith's 1921 erotic verse collection Poetica Erotica. Her 1944 book for children, The Beloved Son, was a life of Jesus in verse.

H. L. Mencken praised Wagstaff's poetic drama Alcestis for its "constant novelty and ingenuity of epithet", though he thought at times she let "her adjectives run riot".

Personal life
In 1907, she married Alfred Wagstaff III (1881–1930), the eldest son of Alfred Wagstaff Jr. Before their divorce in 1920, they were the parents of:

 Alfred Wagstaff IV (1908–1982), who married Julia A. C. Frederick, a daughter of William P. Frederick and descendant of Chief Justice John Marshall, in 1949.

After their divorce, she married well known real estate broker and amateur golf player Donald Carr on July 30, 1921 at Bide-a-Wee, her country place in Manchester, Vermont. During the ceremony, the officiating clergyman read one of her new poems entitled Marriage. Carr, who owned Cedarcliff in Riverside, Connecticut, was the son of Henry Shaler Carr and Tamzin ( Shaler) Carr (a daughter of Civil War Gen. Alexander Shaler).

In 1934, she sold two business buildings, 24 and 26 East 54th Street, adjoining the southwest corner of Madison Avenue, in midtown Manhattan for $400,000. The five-story building at 24 East 54th Street was a wedding gift from her father upon her marriage to Wagstaff. She had acquired the adjoining five-story building at 26 East 54th Street in 1921 and had them renovated for commercial use and leased to single tenants.

Carr died in 1961. Blanche died on December 15, 1967 in Virginia Water in the Borough of Runnymede in Surrey, England. She was interred at the Shoemaker Mausoleum in Woodlawn Cemetery in the Bronx.

Published works 
The Song of Youth (1905)
Woven of Dreams (1908)
Atys, a Grecian Idyl, and Other Poems (1909)
Alcestis: A Poetic Drama (1911)
Colonial Plays for the School-room (1912)
Eris: a Dramatic Allegory (1914)
The Book of Love (1917)
Narcissus and Other Poems (1918)
Quiet Waters (1921)
Bob, the Spaniel: the True Story of a Springer (1927)
Mortality and Other Poems (1930)
The Beloved Son (1944)
After the Flesh (1953)
Sonnets to Parsifal (1960)

References

External links

Entry on Wagstaff at the ViereckProject

1888 births
1959 deaths
Poets from New York (state)
American women poets
20th-century American poets
20th-century American women writers
Writers from New York City